Vixen Romeo is an American singer-songwriter, pin up model and dancer. Romeo is the lead vocalist and founder of the group The Pin Up Girls.

Early life
Romeo was born and raised in New York City and grew up in a Catholic household. She was named after both of her great grandmothers and is of Black Irish, Scottish and Lebanese descent. She is the middle of three children. Romeo became a dance teacher at the age of 16. She taught dance for many years before starting her first Moulin Rouge inspired, hip hop style dance company while still in college. A few years after graduating from SUNY Purchase with a B.A. in Literature and the Visual Arts she started The Pin Up Girls girl group and dance troupe. Divisions in both New York and Los Angeles by 2014. Romeo has written two novels under a pen name, one of which was published by Regal Crest in August 2016. Earlier reviews (pre-publication) include, HarperCollins, Jennifer Pooley, who wrote that Romeo's novels were 'exquisite' and kept her 'turning the pages.'

Image and personal life
Vixen Romeo is the face of The Pin Up Girls. She is also a pin-up model.  Her image has been used on stickers, calendars, snowboards and apparel.  She has also been the subject of many pieces of art.  Romeo has naturally jet black hair and pale skin.  Her makeup includes cat eye black or dark brown liner and bright red lipstick. She can be seen in television appearances such as Curl Girls and The L Word. Her stage/modeling attire includes fishnets and red shoes. On October 27, 2007 Vixen Romeo and fellow group member Top-69 DeWilde got married in a discreet Toronto Canada wedding with close friends and family present. Romeo has been involved politically, campaigning, via performance, interviews and otherwise, for human rights since 2005 when she first formed her troupe, focusing on women's rights, gay teen suicide prevention, GLBT rights as well as events supporting NO on prop 8 campaigning.

The Pin Up Girls
In 2005, Romeo formed The Pin Up Girls a.k.a. The Pin Up Girl Show. The Pin Up Girls began performing at Hollywood's most notorious venues such as The Viper Room, Key Club, Roxy, and The Whisky a Go Go. The girls quickly gained local attention with their girl on girl themed, tribal fusion belly dance, burlesque and hip hop routines. Romeo is the choreographer of the group. Between 2006 and 2008, The Pin Up Girls started to become poster girls for the lesbian scene, with performances for Curve, a guest appearance on LOGO network's reality series Curl Girls, a web series segment on AfterEllen, a performance for the LGBT community hosted by Jane Lynch, and performances in Margaret Cho's Sensuous Woman Show.  In 2008, The Pin Up Girls first recorded single, "There She Goes...She's Real Fly", was picked up to be played on Showtime's hit lesbian series The L Word. In 2009, The Pin Up Girls music video, "There She Goes...She's Real Fly" premiered on Logo (an MTV network), on New Now Next Pop Lab. The Pin Up Girls' music video "Girl Candy," filmed in New York and Los Angeles, was released in 2011. Vixen Romeo starred in "Pretty Things", directed by Joe LaRue; a film noir style murder mystery music video which was released in June 2012.

Choreography
“Hailing from New York City, The Pin Up Girls’ founder, Julia, aka Vixen, is full of Big Apple attitude and moxie. Out and proud, this saucy, sexy vamp has mixed the glamour of old Hollywood and the glitz of modern-day Los Angeles to create the sexiest dyke dance troupe on the planet, The Pin Up Girls.” – Curve Magazine
 
Julia Romeo began dancing in New York at three years of age.  Romeo is a master ballet, jazz, belly dance, hip hop, choreographer.  She has taught and choreographed in New York, Connecticut, San Francisco, Los Angeles and overseas in Beirut, Lebanon.  Romeo, who combined burlesque, ballet, belly dance, fire tribal, hip hop, live zills and doumbek playing, quickly received media attention as the choreographer and head personality in the variety show she created, The Pin Up Girls.
 
“Watching a Pin Up Girls show is like being thrust back to ancient times and then being catapulted to the future.” - Curve Magazine

Discography
Singles
 "There She Goes...She's Real Fly" (2009)
 "Boushie B*tch" (2009)
 "Pin Me Up" (2010)
 "Girl Candy" (2011)
 "Pretty Things" (2012)

Other appearances
 The L Word; music in Season 5 Episode 7 (2008)
 AfterEllen.com (2008)
 New Now Next Pop Lab (2009)
 MtvMusic (2009)

References

External links
The Pin Up Girls on Facebook
The Pin Up Girls on Myspace

Year of birth missing (living people)
Living people
Models from New York City
American women singer-songwriters
American female dancers
American dancers
American female models
American people of Lebanese descent
American people of Irish descent
Dancers from New York (state)
21st-century American women
Singer-songwriters from New York (state)